Stéphane Georges Barré (born 23 January 1970) is a French rower. He competed in the men's lightweight coxless four event at the 1996 Summer Olympics, where they reached the semi-finals before failing to qualify to the finals. Via the B final they ultimately were ranked 7th.

References

1970 births
Living people
French male rowers
Olympic rowers of France
Rowers at the 1996 Summer Olympics
Sportspeople from Rouen